Edward Higginson Williams (June 1, 1824 – December 21, 1899) was an American physician and railroad executive known for his philanthropy.

Early life and medical career
Williams was born on June 1, 1824, in Woodstock, Vermont to Vermont Secretary of State Norman Williams and Mary Ann Wentworth (Brown) Williams. He graduated from Vermont Medical College and worked for a time as a physician. While living in Cavendish, Vermont he was the first physician to treat brain-injury survivor Phineas Gage after Gage's  accident. Williams later became a member of the Royal Swedish Academy of Sciences and was decorated as a Knight of the Order of the Polar Star.

Railroad executive
Williams gave up medicine to work in the railroad industry. He left Vermont and resided in the Rosemont suburb of Philadelphia. Williams became well known in the U.S. for his work with the firm of Burnham, Williams, & Co. In 1870, he joined the Baldwin Locomotive Works.

In addition to his railroad activities, Williams also served as a U.S. commissioner to the Sydney International Exhibition in 1879 and the Melbourne International Exhibition in 1880.

Philanthropy
Williams gave prominently towards education. He constructed and equipped buildings for the teaching of science at Carleton College (dedicated in memory of his son William) and the University of Vermont (in memory of his wife). He also made large donations to the University of Pennsylvania and other educational institutions. Williams donated a library building to his hometown of Woodstock, Vermont as well.

Personal life and death
Williams was married to Cornella Bailey. They had three children:  Edward Higginson Williams Jr., William Williams, and Anna (Williams) Dreer.

Williams died on December 21, 1899, in Santa Barbara, California.

References

External links
Biography at Cromwell-Butler family genealogy site

1824 births
1899 deaths
American railroad executives
Knights of the Order of the Polar Star
Members of the Royal Swedish Academy of Sciences
People from Woodstock, Vermont
Physicians from Philadelphia
Physicians from Vermont
19th-century American businesspeople